Eremias lalezharica, the Lalehzar racerunner, is a species of lizard found in the Iranian village of Lalehzar.

References

Eremias
Reptiles described in 1994
Endemic fauna of Iran
Reptiles of Iran
Taxa named by Jiří Moravec (herpetologist)